Mmbara Hulisani Kevin (born 1979) is the former president of PAYCO, a youth wing of PAC in South Africa. Hulisani made news headlines when he took a defiant stance against Letlapa Mphahlele, even going to the extent of calling for his resignation.

Early life 

Hulisani was born in the former homeland of Venda, in South Africa, in 1979.

Throughout his early life, there is no record to imply any interest in politics. It was only during high school, when Hulisani became the president of the SRC of Guvhukuvhu High School, in the village of Phiphidi in the former Venda; that it became apparent. His stay at the helm of the SRC was marked by a renewed politicization of students who before had quietly led their student lives. Unconfirmed reports places, several student marches in that school, during his reign as president of the SRC.

Politics

Background 
It is not clear when Hulisani became a member of the PAC and PAYCO in particular.

But before serving as the president of PAYCO, Hulisani held some positions within the ranks of the party including its student wing, PASMA, and branches. He also served as the Secretary General of PAYCO before becoming the President.

Hulisani was also one of the voices that opposed the Floor-Crossing policy, championed and legislated by the ANC government, which allowed party representatives in parliament to move to another party while keeping their seats in parliament.

Hulisani also worked as a researcher for the Limpopo legislature in 2003, working with Maxwel Nemadzivhanani, then Provincial chairman of PAC in Limpopo Province.

PAYCO Presidency 

At a PAYCO national congress held in Durban, under the theme "Mobilizing Youth Power to Build Socialism and African Unity", Hulisani was elected president of PAYCO succeeding its former president Sbusiso Xaba.

In March 2008, he condemned the racist video made by students from Free State University. Of the acts portrayed in the video he said they "make a mockery of the struggle against apartheid settler colonialism"

On 30 May 2009, Hulisani convened the 1st Mayihlome Annual Lecture, which was addressed by the former president of PAYCO, Mashao Matome. The lecture was used as a forum to discuss a new program adopted by PAYCO called IOTA, which is aimed at repositioning the PAC. On the same occasion an online News publication called "Mayihlome" was launched on WordPress, Hulisani currently serves as its Chief Editor.

At the PAYCO Kimberly National Congress held in November 2009, Hulisani was succeeded by Ndebele Linda as president of PAYCO

African Socialist International (ASI) 

Hulisani, in his capacity as an official of PAYCO, has a relationship with the ASI, an international body of socialists who pursue a pan-African agenda. In 2006, he had a meeting with ASI Chairman Omali Yeshitela and others, on his visit to South Africa.

Mayihlome News 
On 30 May 2009 Hulisani, as President of the PAYCO launched Mayihlome News, an online Pan-Africanist journal. Initially, Mayihlome News was hosted on the free WordPress platform, and in July 2014 it was moved to a self-hosted platform. Mayihlome News has attracted Pan-Africanists worldwide giving insight into the Pan-Africanist political landscape in South Africa.

Controversies 

Many controversies have followed the election of Hulisani as president of PAYCO. Some even call them politically suicidal:

Call for Lethlapa Mphahlele to step down 

9 January 2008: Hulisani, in a statement, called for the resignation of PAC president Lethlapa Mphahlele. This position was met with strong objection among the leadership of the PAC, who even mentioned that PAYCO did not qualify, as a component structure, to call for the resignation of the president of the organization. Some provincial PAYCO leaders distanced themselves from the decision and the pronouncement made by Hulisani, some even calling it unilateral. However, Hulisani insisted that the decision was not taken by his person but by the NEC of PAYCO, including the provincial leaders.

2009 General Elections 

30 January 2009: a communication was made by the PAYCO NEC, to the members, on the decision to boycott the 2009 General Elections of South Africa to refuse the PAC votes. This position received some opposition from within the Pan Africanist Youth Congress of Azania, and was also against the position of PAC, as it participated in the elections.

Education 

Hulisani Holds an LLB (hons) from Unisa where he also completed his BJuris.

References

1979 births
Living people
People from Thulamela Local Municipality
South African Venda people
Pan Africanist Congress of Azania politicians
University of South Africa alumni